Vaarikuzhi is a 1982 Indian Malayalam film, directed by M. T. Vasudevan Nair and produced by K. C. Joy. The film stars Shubha, Sukumaran, Nedumudi Venu and Sankaradi in the lead roles.

Cast
Shubha
Sukumaran
Nedumudi Venu
Sankaradi
Indira
Kuttyedathi Vilasini
Sudha
Suvarna

References

External links
 

1982 films
1980s Malayalam-language films